The 2019 Nigerian Senate election in Lagos State held on February 23, 2019, to elect members of the Nigerian Senate to represent Lagos State. Solomon Olamilekan Adeola representing Lagos West, Oluremi Tinubu representing Lagos Central. The late Osinowo Sikiru Adebayo represented Lagos East but his death brought Tokunbo Abiru to replace him after a bye-election in 2020.  All won on the platform of All Progressives Congress.

Overview

Summary

Results

Lagos West 
A total of 23 candidates registered with the Independent National Electoral Commission to contest in the election. APC candidate Solomon Olamilekan Adeola won the election, defeating PDP candidate Gbadebo Rhodes-Vivour and 8 other party candidates. Adeola received 41.38% of the votes, while Rhodes-Vivour received 39.40%.

Lagos Central 
A total of 14 candidates registered with the Independent National Electoral Commission to contest in the election. APC candidate Oluremi Tinubu won the election, defeating PDP candidate Onitiri David and 12 other party candidates. Tinubu received 58.03% of the votes, while Onitiri received 39.25%.

Lagos East 
A total of 17 candidates registered with the Independent National Electoral Commission to contest in the election. APC candidate Osinowo Sikiru Adebayo won the election, defeating PDP  candidate Oyefusi Abiodun Adetola and 15 other party candidates. Osinowo received 59.21% of the votes, while Oyefusi received 36.69%.

2020 Bye election 
A bye election was held on 5 December 2020 in the Lagos East Senatorial District due to a vacancy following the demise of Bayo Osinowo. Tokunbo Abiru of APC contested against Babatunde Gbadamosi of PDP. They totalled 89,204 and 11,257 votes respectively. Abiru was declared the winner by INEC.

References 

Lagos State senatorial elections
Senate
Lagos State Senate elections